Gaja is a given name. Notable people with the name include:
 Gaja Alaga (1924–1988), Croatian theoretical physicist 
 Gaja Dabić (c. 1780 – after 1847), duke and leading commander in the Serbian Revolution
 Gaja Grzegorzewska (born 1980), Polish novelist
 Gaja Natlačen (born 1997), Slovenian swimmer
 Gaja Prestor (born 2000), Slovenian singer

See also 
 Gaia (disambiguation)
 Gaya (disambiguation)
 

Given names
Feminine given names
Slavic feminine given names